Qibao Old Street  is a historic area of Qibao in the Minhang District of Shanghai, China.

Overview
It is located south of Qingnian Road.

The area was once the residence of the painter and sculptor Zhang Chongren, a friend of the Belgian cartoonist Hergé, on whom the character Chang Chong-Chen from "The Adventures of Tintin" was based.
Qibao is also known for crickets (with a "Cricket House") in the Qibao Old Street area. The entire area is pedestrianised.

Attractions
The following attractions are located in Qibao Old Town, many of which can be visited with a combined ticket:

 Bell Tower
 Cotton Textile Mill
 Shadowgraph Museum
 The Old Trades House
 Cricket House
 Zhou's Miniature Museum
 The Pawn Shop
 The Memorial Hall of the Artist Zhang Chongren
 Qibao Calligraphy Arts Room

There are three arched stone footbridges over the Puhui River (from west to east):

 Kangle Bridge
 Puhui River Bridge
 Anping Bridge

Tea houses line the Puhui River and there are boat rides from a wharf. There are many shops selling souvenirs and food, especially street food.

Transport
Qibao Old Town can be accessed by taking Shanghai Metro Line 9 to Qibao Station. The most convenient access is from Exit 2.

See also
 List of restaurant districts and streets
 List of twin towns and sister cities in China
 Qibao
 Qibao station (Shanghai Metro)

References

External links

 Go Qibao website 

Tourist attractions in Shanghai
Qibao Old Street
Museum districts
Restaurant districts and streets in China
Minhang District
Neighbourhoods of Shanghai